The 1995 Findlay Oilers football team was an American football team that represented the University of Findlay as a member of the Midwest League within the Mid-States Football Association (MSFA) during the 1995 NAIA Division II football season. In their 23rd season under head coach Dick Strahm, the Oilers compiled a perfect 10–1–2 record (4–1 against conference opponents), outscored opponents by a total of 454 to 114, and was the NAIA Division II national championship, tying with Central Washington, 21–21, in the NAIA Division II Championship Game.

The team played its home games at Donnell Stadium in Findlay, Ohio.

Schedule

References

Findlay Oilers
Findlay Oilers football seasons
NAIA Football National Champions
Findlay Oilers football